The Wych Elm cultivar Ulmus glabra 'Pendula Variegata' was first described in 1850, and later by J. F. Wood in The Midland Florist and Suburban Horticulturist (1851) as U. montana pendula variegata, the  'broad-leaved variegated weeping mountain elm', and was said by him to have originated in and been distributed by the Pontey nursery of Kirkheaton, Huddersfield, Yorkshire. It was listed by Hartwig & Rümpler in Illustrirtes Gehölzbuch (1875) as Ulmus montana (:glabra) var. pendula variegata Hort.

Description
The tree has been described as a form of 'Pendula' (: 'Horizontalis') with beautiful white-variegated leaves. Pontey (1850) described 'Pendula Variegata' as "distinctly striped and margined with silver" and "remarkable for its constancy in variegation", Wood (1851) as "a first rate ornamental tree" with "beautifully striped foliage" and pendulous branches.

Pests and diseases
Not known.

Cultivation
No specimens are known to survive. The tree was cultivated at the Royal Victoria Park, Bath, from the 1850s, where was described as "the variegated-leaved Weeping Scotch Elm" and a form of 'Horizontalis'  (though it was absent from Milburn's 1905 Victoria Park elm list ), and at Kew Gardens, from c. 1896 until at least 1925.

References

Wych elm cultivar
Ulmus articles missing images
Ulmus
Missing elm cultivars